Please Take My Brother Away! (known in Japan as ) is a Chinese web manhua series by You.Ling (幽·灵).

In 2017, the series was adapted into a Japanese television short anime series by Fanworks and Imagineer with Japanese and Mandarin Chinese voices. It aired from April to June 2017, on Tokyo MX. The second season aired from July to December 2018. A third season aired from October to December 2019. The story follows a pair of siblings – a younger sister who is violent, Shi Miao, and her older brother Shi Fen. On June 17, 2020, it was announced that the fourth season will air in October 2020 on Tokyo MX.  A fifth season will premiere in July 2022.

The series was also adapted into a Chinese television drama named Take My Brother Away and a film named Go Brother! in 2018.

Characters
Shi Fen

The older brother, Shi Fen is a first year at high school. He is occasionally getting beaten up by his sister due to his stupid tendencies.
Shi Miao

The younger sister, Shi Miao is a third year at middle school. Her speciality is sports.
Zhen Kaixin

Shi Fen's best friend. Shi Miao is in love with him.
Miaomiao

Shi Miao's best friend.
Wan Sui

A rich guy who transferred schools so people wouldn't look at him for his wealth. He becomes Shi Fen and Kai Xin's best friend. He likes Shi Miao.
Wan Xing

Wan Sui's little brother.

Media

Web manhua
The web manhua is written and illustrated by You.Ling. It is published by Kuaikan Manhua. Two compilations were released by the China Friendship Publishing Company. The web manhua has been read more than 500 million times in China online.

Anime
A 12-episode short anime by Fanworks premiered at Tokyo MX from April 7 to June 23, 2017, and in China in March with each episode 3–4 minutes in length. Brian The Sun performed the opening song titled "Sunny Side Up". Rareko directed and wrote the scripts at Imagineer and Fanworks. Tencent Penguin Pictures planned the project.

A 24-episode second-season premiere from July 9 to December 17, 2018. Youkemao (佑可貓) performed the opening song titled "Let Him Go!!".

A 12-episode third season premiered from October 7 to December 23, 2019. Wang Yue (王玥) performed the opening song titled "Progressive Youth" (進撃的青春).

A 12-episode fourth season premiered in October 2020.

A 12-episode fourth fifth premiered in June 2022.

Season 1 (2017)

Season 2 (2015)

Season 3 (2019)

Season 4 (2020)

Season 5 (2022)

Live action 
In 2018, Netflix premiered a live action version named Take My Brother Away in the format of a television drama.

References

External links
 
 
 
 

Manhua titles
Animated series based on comics
Fanworks (animation studio)
Chinese webcomics
Television shows based on webcomics
Television shows based on manhua
Manhua adapted into television series
Tokyo MX original programming
2017 anime television series debuts